Atai may refer to:

 , a Kanak grand chef killed in the 1878 rebellion in New Caledonia
 Ataí, Maghrebi mint tea
 Atai (chieftain), a Manchu chieftain; see Giocangga
 Atai Ulaan, a Buryat mythological figure
 Atai River, a source for the Bhairab River
 Koita Atai (born 1983), Papua New Guinean cricketer
 Simon Atai (born 1999), Papua New Guinean cricketer
 Wife of Abassi in Efik mythology
 An alternative spelling of Atay, a Turkic name
 A Japanese pronoun
 Atai Mons, a mons on the planet Venus named for the spirit Atai

See also
 Nsit-Atai, local government area of Akwa Ibom State, Nigeria